Hanuman Mandir or Hanuman Temple may refer to:

 Hanuman Temple, Connaught Place, New Delhi
 Shri Hanuman Mandir Dharamshala, a school in West Bengal
 Mahavir Mandir, in Patna, Bihar
 Shri Hanuman Mandir, Sarangpur